Two ships of the Royal Navy have borne the name HMS Frobisher, after the Elizabethan explorer and adventurer Martin Frobisher:

HMS Frobisher was renamed  in 1915, before being launched the following year as an Improved Marksman-class destroyer leader.
 was a  heavy cruiser launched in 1920. She served in the Second World War and was broken up in 1949.

Royal Navy ship names